William Morley (14 August 1842 – 24 May 1926) was a New Zealand Methodist minister and historian. He was born in Orston, Nottinghamshire, England, on 14 August 1842.

References

1842 births
1926 deaths
19th-century New Zealand historians
English emigrants to New Zealand
New Zealand Methodist ministers